The Papal Interdict of 1208 was an interdict laid on England and Wales by Pope Innocent III which generally enforced the closure of the churches, forbade the administration of the Catholic sacraments, and prohibited the use of churchyards for burials.  Issued on 23 March 1208, the interdict lasted for more than six years until it was lifted on 2 July 1214.

Pope Innocent III placed the Kingdom of England under an interdict after King John refused to accept the pope's appointee, Stephen Langton, as Archbishop of Canterbury.

External links
medievalists.net - When England was under Interdict
Catholic Herald - The last lockdown: 13th-century England’s six years without Mass

1208 in England
1209 in England
1210 in England
1211 in England
1212 in England
1213 in England
1214 in England
Catholic penal canon law